The Women's Baltic Cup is a women's association football tournament contested between the Baltic states of Estonia, Latvia, and Lithuania, usually every year. They can also invite other teams to participate, such as the Faroe Islands. The tournament is the women's equivalent of the men's Baltic Cup.

Results

Medal summary
As of 2022.

See also

 Baltic Cup
 Baltic Futsal Cup
 Women's Baltic Football League

References

External links

Baltic Cup (football)
International women's association football invitational tournaments
Recurring sporting events established in 1996
1996 establishments in Europe